Mohamed Lahcen (born 1931) is a Moroccan former middle-distance runner. He competed in the men's 3000 metres steeplechase at the 1960 Summer Olympics.

References

External links
 

1931 births
Possibly living people
Athletes (track and field) at the 1960 Summer Olympics
Moroccan male middle-distance runners
Moroccan male steeplechase runners
Olympic athletes of Morocco